Ross Bank is a submarine bank located in the Ross Sea in the area of Ross Island. Name approved 6/88 (ACUF 228).

References

Undersea banks of the Southern Ocean